The 1973–74 season was the 90th football season in which Dumbarton competed at a Scottish national level, entering the Scottish Football League, the Scottish Cup and the Scottish League Cup.  In addition Dumbarton played in the Stirlingshire Cup.

Story of the Season

Players
Following the last day escape from relegation in the previous season, it was hoped that this season would show a vast improvement, and to this end Davy Wilson gave up his playing boots to become assistant to manager Alex Wright.

Missing from the first XI was Charlie Gallagher who retired after 3 seasons at Boghead with 96 appearances and 40 goals. In addition Jake Bolton was given a free transfer after 3 successful seasons and 111 appearances in a Dumbarton shirt.

Amongst those joining up were goalkeeper John Taylor from Queen’s Park, and full backs Peter McQuade and Don Watt from East Fife and Celtic respectively.

August
The first game of season 1973-74 saw Dumbarton host a first round Stirlingshire Cup tie against Clydebank and easily triumphed 3-0.

The next day a 16 man squad left for a training camp in Spain – the first trip abroad for the club since 1922. During the trip they played a friendly match on 7 August against Spanish regional side LLloret de Mar, winning 5-1.

On their return it was straight into League Cup business where Dumbarton had been drawn in a tough section along with Ayr United, Morton and Hibernian. And so it was to prove as the first four matches yielded just one point - a 1-1 home draw against Morton was all that there was to show, against the loss of all three away games  - 2-0 v Ayr United, 1-0 v Hibernian and 1-0 against Morton.

Meanwhile Dumbarton accepted a £40,000 offer from Dundee for Tom McAdam, but left it up to the young striker to decide as to his future.

On 25 August Dumbarton played the return League Cup tie against Hibernian at Boghead, crushing the Easter Road side 4-1 and leaving the door still open for qualification to the next round. The subsequent 1-0 home win against Ayr United four days later confirmed this and a lucrative second round tie against Rangers.  The good news continued as McAdam decided to remain at Boghead.

September
The new league season commenced on 1 September with a home tie against Dundee United, but despite having the visitors under siege for most of the match, Dundee United won the match 2-1.

The following weekend it was a trip to Brockville to play Falkirk but this time the Dumbarton pressure was converted into goals with a 3-2 win.

On 12 September the first leg of the second round League Cup tie was played against Rangers at Ibrox. Dumbarton were missing John Cushley and Brian Heron, and the previous season’s Scottish Cup winning side easily brushed the Sons aside 6-0.

Roy McCormack joined Cushley and Heron on the injury list when Ayr United came to Boghead for the league fixture on 15 September and in a disappointing game the home side lost 2-0.

The bad results continued a week later at Gayfield when a one goal advantage and barrowloads of other chances were thrown away to lose 2-1 to Arbroath.

The final game of September however saw Dumbarton pick up their first home league win of the season with a deserved 2-0 win over Partick Thistle. On the same day Dumbarton signed teenager Iain Wallace from junior side Yoker Athletic – a player from whom much would be heard from in the future.

So at the end of the month Hearts led the way in the league with 8 points, a point ahead of Motherwell.  Dumbarton were in 13th place on 4 points.

October
On 6 October Dumbarton visited Bayview and Dumbarton came away with both points after an 88th minute Paterson goals secured a 1-0 league win over East Fife.

Four days later, Rangers cruised through to the quarter finals of the League Cup by following up their first leg 6-0 win with a 2-1 victory at Boghead.

The following weekend it was Aberdeen who came to Dumbarton in the league and after a closely contested game it was the visitors who left with the points after a Drew Jarvie goal was enough to complete a 1-0 win.

Unbeaten Hearts hosted Dumbarton on 20 October. Hearts were frustrated by a Dumbarton defensive line up and the match ended in a 0-0 draw – although things could have been worse for Hearts as in the last 10 minutes a penalty claim was turned down as Roy McCormack was upended in the area and an unmarked Willie Wallace missed the target from eight yards.

A week later the Sons travelled to Shawfield in the league to play Clyde and in a fast flowing attacking game Dumbarton achieved a comfortable 3-0 win.  After the game Alex Wright’s position as manager was made full time.

At the end of October Celtic and Hearts led the way in the league with 13 points, while Dumbarton had climbed to 8th with 9 points.

November
Dumbarton celebrated Alex Wright’s first game as full time manager on 3 November with a second successive 3-0 win this time against Motherwell at Boghead – and at the same time moved into 6th place in the league.

However the unbeaten run came to an end a week later when Dundee held on to record a 2-1 win against the Sons at Dens Park.

On 17 November Dumbarton were back in winning ways when they came back from a half time 1-0 deficit to beat St Johnstone 2-1 at Boghead with two Brian Heron goals.

The following weekend saw Celtic visit a muddy Boghead and while silky football was little in evidence, goals from Kenny Dalglish and Bobby Lennox were enough for the visitors to see off the Sons.
  
This meant Celtic headed the league at the end of the month with 21 points from 12 games – 3 points ahead of Hearts. Dumbarton were in 13th place with 13 points.

December
Bad weather caused postponements for a number of weeks meaning the next game took place on 15 December at Cappielow against Morton. A goal in the first half put Dumbarton ahead but two goals in quick succession early in the second half followed by the ordering off of a player from each sides turned the match on its head and eventually Morton finished as 3-1 victors.

The following week Dumbarton entertained Rangers at Boghead and a powerful display by the visitors in the first half was enough to earn both points in a 2-0 win.

On 29 December Dumbarton were on the road again this time to Tannadice to face off against Dundee United and in a superb display topped off by four goals from teenager Andy Gray, the home team devastated the Sons by 6-0.

The same weekend long term utility player Kenny Jenkins announced his intention to emigrate to Australia. Over five seasons Jenkins had played 175 matches for Dumbarton and had scored 22 goals.

So 1973 ended with Celtic pulling further ahead in the league with 27 points from 16 matches played – 6 ahead of Rangers, while Dumbarton had slipped to 13th still with 13 points.

January
The first game of 1974 brought winless Falkirk to Boghead, but it was to be Dumbarton who would suffer their fifth straight defeat with the Bairns breaking their duck in handsome fashion, 5-1.

On 5 January Dumbarton visited Somerset Park to play Ayr United and the plan to stem the leaky defence appeared to work as a Ross Mathie goal was sufficient to take both points.

A week later Arbroath came to Boghead and in the first half it looked as if the previous defensive frailties had returned as the visitors led 2-0. However a freak goal by Colin McAdam where a free kick taken 5 yards inside his own half bounced on the penalty spot and over the goalkeeper followed by a Willie Wallace strike changed the whole complexion of the game. Thereafter it was all Dumbarton and a Ross Mathie hat-trick completed an amazing 5-2 win.

Away from the domestic scene, Scotland had qualified for the World Cup finals and Dumbarton made an amazing offer to one of Scotland’s future opponents Zaire to play a friendly. Current SFA rules prohibited club sides from meeting international teams but the plan was to play a select XI. As it was the proposal never came off.

On 19 January Dumbarton travelled to Firhill to play Partick Thistle but despite both teams playing attacking games the game finished in a 0-0 draw.

Three days later Dumbarton paid a nominal fee to Norwich City for the transfer of Alan Black who had in fact left Dumbarton 11 years earlier on a free transfer.

The following week Dumbarton headed north to Arbroath in the third round of the Scottish Cup.  It was not however to be a repeat of the fine win a fortnight earlier as the home side recorded a 1-0 victory to advance to the next round.

The top of the league at the end of January had Celtic still in front with 34 points from 19 games played – but it was now Hibernian who were the nearest challengers, 6 points behind. Dumbarton were in 11th with 18 points from 20 matches.

February
After a free week Dumbarton travelled to Pittodrie to play Aberdeen in the league, While the game ended in a 3-0 defeat it was overshadowed by bad injuries to two players. During the game Dons young striker Bobby Street broke his leg and Sons goalkeeper Lawrie Williams suffered a fractured cheekbone.

On 16 February East Fife were the visitors to Boghead and not for the first time this season the name of the ground was playing true to its name.  Appropriately the goals were scored from headers and finished in a 1-1 draw.

The following weekend Hearts arrived on league business and while the playing surface continued to cause problems the visitors managed to leave with both points after a 1-0 win.

At the end of February Celtic continued at the top of the league with 36 points from 22 games played, still being chased by Hibernian, now 5 points behind. Dumbarton maintained 11th place with 19 points from 23 matches.

March
The Boghead surface continued to cause problems as Clyde arrived to play their league fixture on 9 March but it was the visitors who adapted quicker to the conditions and went into an early lead.  Nevertheless a 16 yard strike from Wallace in the second half was enough to earn Dumbarton a point.

The next match occurred on 23 March with an away tie against St Johnstone and it looked like Dumbarton were easing towards both points with a 2-0 lead. The home team’s goal on 69 minutes seemed to be only a consolation as the game moved into time added. Then St Johnstone’s Muir scored a quick double which turned the match on its head - only for Colin McAdam to mount a last gasp counter attack and score the equaliser in the 93rd minute.

In midweek, Dumbarton took a rest from league business to visit Firs Park in a Stirlingshire Cup semi final tie against East Stirling – only progressing on penalties after struggling to a 2-2 draw.

The following weekend Dumbarton visited Celtic Park to take on the team going for their ninth title in a row – but it was the underdogs who shocked the Celtic crowd going in at half time 2-1 up.  Kenny Dalglish levelled matters but back came the Sons with an 18 yard strike from Peter Coleman – only for Dixie Deans to equalise with 6 minutes to play.

April
On 6 April Hibernian came to Boghead, and once again Dumbarton led the way at half time by 2-1.  However Hibs fought back and were level by the 60th minute only for John Bourke to push Dumbarton ahead once more three minutes later.  But for the third week in a row the result would finish as a 3-3 draw as Cropley scored a last minute goal for the visitors.

Three days later Dumbarton travelled to Motherwell and despite a spirited performance it was the Sons who left pointless in a 2-0 defeat.

Dumbarton had now gone 9 league games without a win and relegation worries were not far away.  On 13 April the Sons arrived at East End Park to play fellow strugglers Dunfermline, and despite taking an early 2-0 lead it was the Fifers who came back to snatch a 3-2 win.

Things did not get any better four days later in a midweek match against Hibernian at Easter Road, with Hibs strolling to a comfortable 3-0 win.

However on 20 April, relegation woes were finally dispelled with a 1-0 win over Morton – the first league success since 11 January.

This was followed up with a second successive 1-0 win at Boghead on 24 April – this time against Dunfermline.

In the final league game of April – and the seventh game in 3 weeks – Dumbarton travelled to Ibrox to play Rangers. The home side were easily the better side but had only a Fyfe goal to show for their superiority at half time. However two Scott goals early in the second half decided the tie, with Heron scoring a consolation goal in the 3-1 defeat.

Four days later Dumbarton took on Stirling Albion at Boghead in the final of the Stirlingshire Cup, with the home side just failing to retain the trophy after losing a penalty shoot-out following a 2-2 draw.

May
The final game of the league campaign presented Dumbarton with the opportunity to claim 10th spot in the league and a place in next season’s Texaco Cup – and first half goals from Heron and Bourke were sufficient to beat Dundee 2-0.  However as it happened the qualification rules were amended and the Texaco Cup dream was not to be.

Post Season Review
While Celtic had scooped their record ninth title in a row, Dumbarton had their best league campaign since 1918.

During the season Roy McCormack made his 300th appearance for Dumbarton (on 23 February against Hearts).  In addition Billy Wilkinson made his ‘century’ of appearances in a Dumbarton shirt against East Fife on 6 October.

Results

Scottish First Division

Scottish Cup

Scottish League Cup

Stirlingshire Cup

Friendly

Player statistics

Squad 

|}

Source:

Transfers

Players in

Players out 

Source:

Reserve team
Dumbarton competed in the Scottish Reserve League, and with 12 wins and 6 draws from 34 matches, finished 12th of 18 for the second successive season.

Dumbarton again entered the Scottish Second XI Cup, and again reached the third round where Celtic were to prove too good on the day by four goals to none.

For the first time, Dumbarton entered the Scottish Reserve League Cup, and after qualifying from their section with 4 wins and a draw from 6 games, they eventually lost out to Partick Thistle in a two-legged semi final.

References

Dumbarton F.C. seasons
Scottish football clubs 1973–74 season